Ligstroside is an important phenolic compound present in olive cultivars. It has a role as a plant metabolite and an antineoplastic agent.  Differs from oleuropein by one hydroxyl group.

References

Phenylethanoids
Phenol antioxidants
Anti-inflammatory agents
Glucosides
Phytoestrogens
Olives
Olive oil
Phytochemicals